RP-570 is a communications protocol used in industrial environments to communicate between a front-end computer and the substation to be controlled.

It is a SCADA legacy protocol and is based on the low-level protocol IEC TC57, format class 1.2.

RP-570 stands for: 
"RTU Protocol based on IEC 57 part 5-1 (present IEC 870) version 0 or 1"

External links
Details may be found here:
RP 570 Protocol Description
Overview of supported protocol features in RP 570
RP 570/1 Master & Slave OPC Server

Network protocols